Henry Ariganyira Musasizi (born 25 February 1981) is a Ugandan business administrator, certified public accountant and politician. He is the reelected Member of Parliament for Rubanda County East and a representative for NRM, the ruling political party in Uganda.

Musasizi was the chairperson of the Committee on Finance, Planning and Economic Development and a member of the Business Committee in the 10th Parliament of Uganda. He is the Chairperson NRM Rubanda District He also served on the Public Accounts Committee in the 9th Parliament of the Pearl of Africa.

Early life and education
Musasizi was born in Rubanda, Kabale District, on 25 February 1981 in a Catholic family of the Bakiga. He had his primary education in his home district of Kabale acquiring his PLE certification in 1994. He then attended Kigezi College Butobere for his O-Level education, attaining his UCE certification in 1998,  and the same school for his A-Level education where he acquired his UACE certification in 2000.

Musasizi further advanced to Makerere University where he graduated in 2005 with a Bachelor of Commerce. He then pursued a postgraduate certificate at the Institute of Certified Public Accountants of Uganda (ICPAU) and became a certified public accountant in 2009. In 2012, Musasizi attained a Master of Business Administration from Heriot-Watt University, a public university based in Edinburgh, Scotland.

Career
Upon acquiring his bachelor's degree in 2005, Musasizi worked for a year as an accountant with Caritas-Kabale Diocese, the social services and development department of the Roman Catholic Diocese of Kabale. In 2007, he got employment at the African Medical and Research Foundation, AMREF, and still worked as an accountant up-to 2010 when he resigned to join elective politics.

In 2011, Musasizi bid for the Rubanda County East parliamentary seat on the NRM ticket, and went on to win in both the party’s primaries and in the general elections and became a member of Uganda's 9th Parliament. In 2016, Musasizi won reelection and continues to serve the constituents of Rubanda County East in the 10th Parliament of the Republic of Uganda. In the 9th Parliament, Musasizi served on the Public Accounts Committee. In the 10th Parliament of Uganda, he was the chairperson of the Committee on Finance, Planning and Economic Development and is a member of the Business Committee.

On June 8, 2021, Musasizi was appointed by H.E. Yoweri Museveni as the State Minister of Finance, Planning and Economic Development in charge of General Duties.

See also
Parliament of Uganda
Kabale District
National Resistance Movement

References

External links
 Website of the Parliament of Uganda

Living people
1981 births
Members of the Parliament of Uganda
National Resistance Movement politicians
Makerere University alumni
People from Kabale District
People from Western Region, Uganda
Active politicians
21st-century Ugandan politicians